Who Would Imagine a King is a Christmas song written and composed by Mervyn Warren and Hallerin Hilton Hill, and originally recorded by Whitney Houston for the soundtrack to the 1996 film, The Preacher's Wife.

In 2009, Lotta Engberg recorded the song on the album Jul hos mig.

In 2010, a cover of the song appeared on Katharine McPhee's Christmas album Christmas Is the Time to Say I Love You.

In 2020,American contemporary Christian singing group Heritage Singers cover this song on their newest CD "Home For Christmas".

Charts

Whitney Houston version

References 

1996 songs
American Christmas songs
Gospel songs
Lotta Engberg songs
Songs written by Mervyn Warren
Whitney Houston songs